Pelagodinium béii is a photosynthetic dinoflagellate that forms a symbiotic relationship with planktonic foraminifera.

Discovery and classification

P. béii was originally described as Gymnodinium béii by marine isotope geochemist Howard Spero in 1987, after being discovered in the eastern Pacific Ocean. It was redefined as P. béii in 2010 after its Ribosomal RNA was characterized, revealing it to be a relative of the genus Symbiodinium. Symbiodinium is a well-studied endosymbiont of deep water invertebrates, protists and foraminifera, found especially alongside reef-dwelling organisms.

Ecology

The P. béii contains a single straight elongated apical vesicle with a row of small knobs, eight latitudinal series of amphiesmal vesicles, and a Type E eyespot. When not living as a symbiont the species is able to enter a motile stage.

Like Symbiodinium, P. béii is a member of the Suessiales order, which lack thecal armored plates. P. béii is hosted by at least four foraminifera: G. ruber, G. conglobatus, G. sacculifer and Orbulina universa.

See also
Globigerina bulloides

References

Dinoflagellates